The 1904 Western Conference football season was the ninth season of college football played by the member schools of the Western Conference (later known as the Big Ten Conference) and was a part of the 1904 college football season.

Season overview

Results and team statistics

Key

PPG = Average of points scored per game
PAG = Average of points allowed per game

Regular season

Bowl games
No Western Conference schools participated in any bowl games during the 1904 season.

Awards and honors

All-Western players

Eleven players were chosen as first-team players on at least four of the 1904 All-Western college football teams named by the following eight selectors: Collier's Weekly (COL), Chicago Record-Herald (CRH), Chicago Tribune (CT), Detroit Free Press (DFP), Detroit Tribune (DT), The Minneapolis Journal (MJ), The St. Louis Republic (SLR), and Walter Camp (WC) in Collier's Weekly. (Players unanimously chosen by all eight selectors are listed in bold.)

 Claude Rothgeb, end, Illinois (COL, CRH, CT, DFP, DT, SLR, WC)
 James Irving Bush, end, Wisconsin (COL, CRH, DFP, DT, MJ, WC)
 Joe Curtis, tackle, Michigan (COL, CRH, CT, DFP, DT, MJ, SLR, WC)
 Wilson Bertke, tackle, Wisconsin (COL, DFP, MJ, SLR, WC)
 Walton W. Thorpe, guard, Minnesota (COL, CRH, CT, DFP, DT, MJ, SLR, WC)
 Charles A. Fairweather, guard, Illinois (COL, CRH, CT, DFP, SLR, WC)
 John Hazelwood, center, Illinois (COL, CRH, CT, SLR)
 Walter Eckersall, Chicago (COL, CRH, CT, DFP, DT, SLR, WC) 
 Willie Heston, halfback, Michigan (COL, CRH, CT, DFP, DT, MJ, SLR, WC)
 E. J. Vanderboom, halfback, Wisconsin (DFP, DT, SLR, WC)
 Frank Longman, fullback, Michigan (COL, CRH, DFP, DT)

All-Americans

The following three Western Conference players were consensus first-team players on the 1904 College Football All-America Team. 

 Fred Speik, end, Chicago (Caspar Whitney [CW])
 Willie Heston, halfback, Michigan (Walter Camp [WC], New York Evening Telegram)
 Walter Eckersall, fullback, Chicago (CW, WC)

References